Ed Humphreys (born June 5, 1953) is a Canadian retired professional ice hockey goaltender.

Humphreys was born in Eston, Saskatchewan, Canada. He played 30 games in the World Hockey Association with the Calgary Cowboys and Quebec Nordiques during the 1975–76 and 1976–77 seasons.

References

External links
 

1953 births
Beauce Jaros players
Calgary Cowboys players
Canadian ice hockey goaltenders
Charlotte Checkers (SHL) players
Ice hockey people from Saskatchewan
Living people
Montreal Canadiens draft picks
People from Eston, Saskatchewan
Quebec Nordiques (WHA) players
Roanoke Valley Rebels (SHL) players
Tulsa Oilers (1964–1984) players
Vancouver Blazers draft picks
Canadian expatriate ice hockey players in the United States